Hydesville is a census-designated place (CDP) in Humboldt County, California, United States. The population was 1,237 at the 2010 census, up from 1,209 at the 2000 census.

Geography

Demographics

2010
The 2010 United States Census reported that Hydesville had a population of 1,237. The racial makeup of Hydesville was 1,108 (89.6%) White, 4 (0.3%) African American, 33 (2.7%) Native American, 6 (0.5%) Asian, 0 (0.0%) Pacific Islander, 30 (2.4%) from other races, and 56 (4.5%) from two or more races. Hispanic or Latino of any race were 71 persons (5.7%).

The Census reported that 1,235 people (99.8% of the population) lived in households, 1 (0.1%) lived in non-institutionalized group quarters, and 1 (0.1%) were institutionalized.

There were 485 households, out of which 136 (28.0%) had children under the age of 18 living in them, 282 (58.1%) were opposite-sex married couples living together, 41 (8.5%) had a female householder with no husband present, 34 (7.0%) had a male householder with no wife present.  There were 32 (6.6%) unmarried opposite-sex partnerships, and 9 (1.9%) same-sex married couples or partnerships. 102 households (21.0%) were made up of individuals, and 40 (8.2%) had someone living alone who was 65 years of age or older. The average household size was 2.55.  There were 357 families (73.6% of all households); the average family size was 2.91.

The population was spread out, with 262 people (21.2%) under the age of 18, 88 people (7.1%) aged 18 to 24, 250 people (20.2%) aged 25 to 44, 449 people (36.3%) aged 45 to 64, and 188 people (15.2%) who were 65 years of age or older.  The median age was 46.2 years. For every 100 females, there were 102.8 males.  For every 100 females age 18 and over, there were 102.7 males.

The homeowner vacancy rate was 1.9%; the rental vacancy rate was 3.2%.  948 people (76.6% of the population) lived in owner-occupied housing units and 287 people (23.2%) lived in rental housing units.

2000
As of the census of 2000, there were 1,209 people, 457 households, and 345 families residing in the CDP. The racial makeup of the CDP was 91.73% White, 3.72% Native American, 0.25% Asian, 1.41% from other races, and 2.89% from two or more races.  4.80% of the population were Hispanic or Latino of any race.

There were 457 households, out of which 31.5% had children under the age of 18 living with them, 62.4% were married couples living together, 8.5% had a female householder with no husband present, and 24.3% were non-families. 17.5% of all households were made up of individuals, and 7.7% had someone living alone who was 65 years of age or older.  The average household size was 2.65 and the average family size was 2.97.

In the CDP, the population was spread out, with 25.2% under the age of 18, 6.7% from 18 to 24, 25.1% from 25 to 44, 30.2% from 45 to 64, and 12.8% who were 65 years of age or older.  The median age was 41 years. For every 100 females, there were 99.2 males.  For every 100 females age 18 and over, there were 97.4 males.

The median income for a household in the CDP was $42,411, and the median income for a family was $45,625. Males had a median income of $38,375 versus $21,471 for females. The per capita income for the CDP was $18,629.  About 8.5% of families and 11.0% of the population were below the poverty line, including 14.0% of those under age 18 and 1.9% of those age 65 or over.

History
Hydesville post office opened in 1861. The town was named for John Hyde, donor of the land on which the town sits.

In 1879, there was a professional minor league  baseball team in Hydesville, in the short-lived Humboldt County League. During 1910–1918, the town was temporarily called Goose Prairie before changing back to Hydesville.

Government

Public and private organizations 
Murrish market is the largest store in Hydesville. 
Hydesville has a  post office and an old one. 
Hydesville also has an elementary school – the Hydesville Wildcats.

See also

References

Census-designated places in Humboldt County, California
Census-designated places in California